At Five O'Clock in the Afternoon (also released as At Five in the Afternoon) is a 1961 Spanish drama film directed by Juan Antonio Bardem and starring Rafael Alcántara. The film was selected as the Spanish entry for the Best Foreign Language Film at the 33rd Academy Awards, but was not accepted as a nominee. According to MGM records, the film made a profit of $46,000.

Cast
 Rafael Alcántara as Acompañante
 Ramsay Ames as Americana
 Manuel Arbó as Camarero viejo
 Matilde Artero as Encargada de servicios
 Joaquín Bergía as Policía
 José Calvo as Amigo
 Germán Cobos as José Álvarez
 Faustino Cornejo as Amigo
 Rafael Cortés as Aficionado
 Enrique Diosdado as Manuel Marcos (as Enrique A. Diosdado)
 Núria Espert as Gabriela

See also
 List of submissions to the 33rd Academy Awards for Best Foreign Language Film
 List of Spanish submissions for the Academy Award for Best Foreign Language Film

References

External links
 

1961 films
1960s Spanish-language films
1961 drama films
Spanish black-and-white films
Films directed by Juan Antonio Bardem
Bullfighting films
1960s Spanish films